Eagle Air was an airline from Sierra Leone, existing from 2006 to 2016.

History 
The company was formed in 2006 as a successor to Sierra National Airlines. It currently operates scheduled and charter services from Lungi International Airport.

Destinations 
In 2018 Eagle Air has six destinations

Fleet  

Eagle Air's fleet has a fleet of one aircraft.

See also 
 Eagle Air (disambiguation)

References

Airlines banned in the European Union
Airlines formerly banned in the European Union
Defunct airlines of Sierra Leone